The 1998–99 snooker season was a series of snooker tournaments played between June 1998 and May 1999. The following table outlines the results for the ranking and the invitational events.


Calendar

Official rankings 

The top 16 of the world rankings, these players automatically played in the final rounds of the world ranking events and were invited for the Masters.

Points distribution 
1998/1999 points distribution for world ranking events:

Notes

References

External links

1998
Season 1999
Season 1998